Alperschällihorn is a mountain of the Lepontine Alps, overlooking Splügen in the canton of Graubünden. The mountains is situated between the Safien valley (north) and the Hinterrhein valley (south).

References

External links
 Alperschällihorn on Hikr

Mountains of the Alps
Alpine three-thousanders
Mountains of Graubünden
Lepontine Alps
Mountains of Switzerland
Safiental
Rheinwald